Ivan Yefimovich Petrov (– 7 April 1958) was a Soviet Army General from 1941.

Early military career
Born in Trubchevsk in 1896, he began his military service in the Red Army in 1918, the year when he also joined the Bolshevik Party. Petrov fought in the Russian Civil War near Samara, the Polish Soviet War of 1920 and the Basmachi rebellion in 1922. In the late 1920s and 1930s Petrov served in Central Asia.

World War II
During World War II, Petrov participated in the Battle of Odessa, Battle of Sevastopol and was noted for heading the Separate Coastal Army from October 1941 to July 1942 and in November 1943-February 1944, 44th Army in August–October 1942, Black Sea Group of Forces, North Caucasus Front, 33rd Army in 1944, 2nd Belorussian Front, 4th Ukrainian Front, and several other units. In April–June 1945 Petrov was a chief of the 1st Ukrainian Front Staff.

Awards
On May 29, 1945 Petrov was awarded the title of the Hero of the Soviet Union. The United States awarded him the Distinguished Service Cross in War Department General Order No. 3 of 1944.

After the war Petrov commanded the Turkestan Military District and was inspector general of land forces. Petrov died in Moscow in 1958 and is buried in the Novodevichy Cemetery.

Honours and awards
 Hero of the Soviet Union
 Five Orders of Lenin
 Order of the Red Banner, four times
 Order of Suvorov, 1st class
 Order of Kutuzov, 1st class
 Order of the Red Star
 Order of the Red Banner of Labour of the Turkmen SSR
 Order of Red Banner of Labour of the Uzbek SSR
 Order of the Red Banner of Labour
 Order of Merit, 1st class (Hungary)
 Military Order of the White Lion "For Victory", 2nd class (Czechoslovakia)
 War Cross, 1939 (Czechoslovakia)
 Cross of Grunwald, 3rd class (Poland)
 Medal of Victory and Freedom 1945 (Poland)
 Distinguished Service Cross (USA)
 Jubilee Medal "XX Years of the Workers' and Peasants' Red Army"
 Medal "For the Defence of Odessa"
 Medal "For the Defence of Sevastopol"
 Medal "For the Defence of the Caucasus"
 Medal "For the Victory over Germany in the Great Patriotic War 1941–1945"
 Medal "For the Capture of Berlin"
 Medal "For the Liberation of Prague"

Commands Held

References

http://generals.dk/general/Petrov/Ivan_Efimovich/Soviet_Union.html
page from warheroes.ru in Russian

1896 births
1958 deaths
People from Bryansk Oblast
People from Oryol Governorate
Bolsheviks
Communist Party of the Soviet Union members
Members of the Supreme Soviet of the Soviet Union
Army generals (Soviet Union)
Soviet people of World War II
Heroes of the Soviet Union
Recipients of the Distinguished Service Cross (United States)
Recipients of the Order of Lenin
Recipients of the Order of the Red Banner
Recipients of the Order of Suvorov, 1st class
Recipients of the Order of Kutuzov, 1st class
Recipients of the Order of the Cross of Grunwald, 3rd class
Recipients of the Military Order of the White Lion
Recipients of the Czechoslovak War Cross
Burials at Novodevichy Cemetery